"The Good Samaritan" is the 37th episode of the sitcom Seinfeld. It is the 20th episode of the third season, and first aired on March 4, 1992. This is the only episode of Seinfeld to be directed by one of the show's stars, Jason Alexander, who played George Costanza.

Plot
Jerry witnesses a hit-and-run driver hitting another car. He is on the car phone with Elaine, who tells him he has to go after the driver. He does, but when the driver steps out he sees that she is a beautiful woman named Angela (played by Melinda McGraw) and decides to date her. Jerry lies to Elaine, saying he pursued the driver into Queens and intimidated him with karate moves. After dating Angela, Jerry finds out that the car that she hit belongs to Becky Gelke (an uncredited Helen Slater), who he has always wanted to date. He tells Becky that he will do something about the damage. Meanwhile, Kramer has convulsions from Mary Hart's voice.

George and Elaine go out to dinner with a married couple, Robin and Michael. Elaine makes up an elaborate story that she once dated a matador from Spain named Eduardo Corrochio. When Robin (Ann Talman) sneezes, Michael (Joseph Malone) does not say anything, and after several seconds George says "God bless you". When George makes light of Michael's rudeness, he gets mad. Robin falls for George due to the incident, and they have an affair. As George and Robin are in bed together, Michael calls Elaine, wanting to speak to Robin. Not knowing that Robin used her as an alibi, Elaine tells him she isn't there, and Michael figures out Robin is with George.

Jerry confronts Angela about Becky's car, but she threatens him with bodily harm should he tell anyone of her guilt. Elaine walks in on the exchange and realizes Jerry lied, only for Jerry to turn it around when he learns of Elaine’s lie about dating a matador. Jerry goes to Becky's house to write out a check for her damages and then ask her out, but Becky assumes he is the hit-and-run driver, seeing no other reason why he might want to pay for the damages. George escapes from Michael by joining Jerry on his out of town gigs. Kramer uses the accident as an excuse to talk to Becky and gets a date with her. But when he rings the bell at her apartment and she opens the door, Mary Hart is on the TV and Kramer has another convulsion.

Production
The cast and crew had hoped the saying "You’re so good looking" would catch on with fans just as "These pretzels are making me thirsty" did, but it proved to be a comedic flop.

The subplot concerning Kramer having seizures every time he hears Mary Hart's voice is based on an actual case reported in the New England Journal of Medicine.

References

External links 

Seinfeld (season 3) episodes
1992 American television episodes